Ksenia Sergeyevna Doronina (born 20 October 1990 in Moscow) is a Russian figure skater, and two-time (2007 & 2008) Russian Champion. She competed for two seasons on the Junior Grand Prix circuit. Doronina missed the 2008–09 season due to mononucleosis.

Programs

Competitive highlights

References

External links

 

Russian female single skaters
1990 births
Living people
Figure skaters from Moscow